Whitefriars College is a Roman Catholic Independent school for boys located in the Melbourne suburb of Donvale, Australia. Established in 1961, the College reflects the tradition of the Carmelites, and is recognised for its uniform's brown blazer with the College Crest appearing on the breast pocket. The College has been a member of the Associated Catholic Colleges since 1999. The College was one of the first schools in Victoria to implement a notebook-computer program, which has now transitioned to a notebook-tablet program, in which every student is provided with a notebook-tablet. Its student population makes it the second largest independent school and educator of boys in the Municipality of Manningham.

The College is the only Carmelite school in Australia.

House system 
The College has eight houses, each one named after a Carmelite of note. The houses are:

As there is a vertical pastoral care (more commonly known as homeroom) system at the College, each house is made up of seven pastoral care groups and each group contains approximately 24 students. This change was made in 2005. Each house is governed by a Head of House. Unlike other schools, students at Whitefriars College are more so responsible to their respective Head of House combined with Pastoral Care teacher, than that of their Year level co-ordinator.

50 years celebration
The College celebrated its 50th year in operation from 2010 to 2011. The school received a New Chapel, Quadrangle and Classrooms to commemorate the occasion. In addition to this, some existing classrooms were also renovated. Students were also presented with a 50-year badge to be worn on their blazer lapel.

Principals

Sport 
Whitefriars is a member of the Associated Catholic Colleges (ACC).

ACC premierships 
Whitefriars has won the following ACC premierships.

 Basketball (11) - 2001, 2004, 2005, 2006, 2007, 2009, 2010, 2011, 2012, 2013, 2019
 Cricket (5) - 2002, 2003, 2012, 2015, 2020
 Football (4) - 2004, 2005, 2013, 2014
 Hockey (3) - 2014, 2015, 2017
 Swimming (13) - 1999, 2000, 2001, 2002, 2003, 2004, 2005, 2006, 2008, 2014, 2015, 2016, 2017
 Tennis (5) - 2011, 2012, 2017, 2020, 2021

Facilities

Whitefriars college is situated upon  of land, making it one of the largest sites of any Catholic Secondary College in Melbourne.

It has a range of facilities, most being specific to the faculty which resides within the building.

Faculty of Sport
 Guggenheimer Gymnasium. A soft-court facility used for Basketball, Indoor Soccer, Badminton, Volleyball and some Gymnastic Apparatus. 
 McPhee Gymnasium. A hardwood facility, used for Basketball, Badminton, Volleyball and Indoor Hockey. 
 Two football ovals, both with Cricket Pitches
 One Soccer Pitch
 Three Cricket Nets
 Fitness and Weights Facility/Gym

Faculty of Science and IST
 Seven science laboratories 
 One Computer Technology room

Faculty of English (Butler Building or, B-Block, First Floor)
 Four classrooms, predominantly for the use of VCE English classes

Faculty of Visual Arts (Butler Building or, B-Block; Second Floor)
 A fully specialised wood, metal and acrylic/plastic works facility
 Specialised media room, complete with a media studio
 Specialised VCD and Studio Arts room
 Junior and Middle School art rooms

Faculty of Performing Arts (Butler Building or, B-Block; Third Floor)
 Healy-Wilson Theatre. Received a light renovation in 2013.
 Specialised recording studios
 Keyboard lab
 Two interconnecting Function Rooms
 Drama Mezzanine that connects to the second floor
 Music and Drama rooms

Faculty of Mathematics (Undercroft or, U-Block)
 Four classrooms, predominantly for the use of VCE Mathematics

Some facilities are not faculty specific, and include:

The Duncan Centre (D-Block)

Named after Bernadette Duncan, this eight-classroom block was completed in 2007, specifically for the use of Year 7s. Each classroom is specific to a year 7 house class. It also has a foyer that acts as a Pastoral Care room.

F-Block

An eight-classroom block, consisting of three newer classrooms completed alongside the Duncan Centre in 2007, and five portable classrooms. It is primarily used by year 8s and 9s.

C-Block (Formally known as, 'Southern Wing')

A five classroom block mainly used by middle school and LOTE classes. It also has one science lab, used mainly for Junior School Science.
In 2017, this classroom block was demolished to create a more open space in the college between the Quadrangle and the Chapel. It will also allow easier connection between the new Science and Technology centre to the rest of the college.

Science and Technology Centre

A need for new science and technology facilities was identified in the 2015 College masterplan. Construction on a new facility located on a previous staff-parking site, next to the Duncan Centre, commenced in 2017. This new three-level facility will feature Science labs, Material Technology spaces and will also introduce Food technology to the college for the first time. A 200 seat lecture theatre and function spaces will also be included in this new facility.

Shortis Library

Named after the founding principal of Whitefriars, Frank Shortis, the library is widely used before school, during recess, lunch and afterschool by students of all year levels. It provides a wide array of information services that extend far beyond that of average school libraries, as well as acting as a light and relaxed social gathering space for students. It is one of the most used facilities within the college, also offering Year 10 study hall after school on specified days.

Cameron Centre

Named after the Colleges Services Coordinator, Marie Cameron, this centre is equipped with a large canteen and spacious decking for students to enjoy. It is also home to the Whitefriars Health Centre, Uniform Store, Second-Hand Uniform store and the Notebook Service Centre.

In May 2014, it was announced that the Cameron Centre would undergo renovations, creating a relaxing and warm environment for students to socialise.

Undercroft and Study Hall

The Undercroft is located underneath the college library, and consists of four classrooms, mainly used for VCE Mathematics. It also houses the Year 12 study hall.

In 2013 it was announced that the Study Hall would undergo a light renovation, creating a comfortable environment for year 12 students to study collectively in. It was completed in time for the commencement of the school year in 2014.

Community service 
The school has two student-run community service organisations, the Key Club, sponsored by the Doncaster-Templestowe Kiwanis, and Young St. Vinnie's. Both groups work in the school community as well as in the wider community on a number of projects. The Key Club runs a recycling drive and St Vinnie's runs a weekly blood donation drive, in which VCE students are encouraged to give blood.

Notable alumni 
Sam Collins – Fremantle Football Club, Gold Coast Football Club Footballer and No. 55 2015 NAB AFL Draft
Patrick Cronin - Manslaughter victim
David Morris – 2010 Olympic Aerial Skier and Australian record holder; 2014 Winter Olympic silver medalist.
Marc Murphy (2005) – Carlton Footballer and No. 1 AFL Draft Pick. Former Captain of Carlton Football Club
Xavier O'Neill – West Coast Eagles footballer
Andy Otten (2007) – Adelaide Football Club and No. 27 draft pick 2007
Christian Petracca – Melbourne Football Club Footballer and No. 2 2014 NAB AFL Draft, 2021 Premiership player, 2021 Norm Smith Medalist
Victor Perton - Long standing member for Doncaster (1988–2006)  
Ben Simmons – Philadelphia 76ers NBA Basketballer and No. 1 2016 NBA Draft
Paul van der Haar – Essendon Football Club Footballer – 1984 / 1985 Premiership Winners – Essendon Team of the Century 
Karl von Möller - Film Director and Cinematographer
Sam Weideman – Melbourne Football Club Footballer and No. 9 2015 NAB AFL Draft
Joseph Zema - Canadian footballer

Controversy 

In 2019, Whitefriars reached a confidential settlement with a student relating to accusations that the school failed to take adequate action after an older student allegedly groomed and sexually abused at least two younger boys.

See also 
 List of schools in Victoria
 List of high schools in Victoria
 Victorian Certificate of Education

References

External links 
Whitefriars College Website

Catholic secondary schools in Melbourne
Carmelite educational institutions
Associated Catholic Colleges
Boys' schools in Victoria (Australia)
Educational institutions established in 1961
1961 establishments in Australia
Buildings and structures in the City of Manningham